Avinoffia is a genus of moths in the family Sphingidae containing only one species, Avinoffia hollandi. It is known from Cameroon, Gabon, Congo and Liberia.

References

Smerinthini
Monotypic moth genera
Moths of Africa
Taxa named by Benjamin Preston Clark